Dutluca can refer to:

 Dutluca, Akseki
 Dutluca, Burhaniye
 Dutluca, Kemaliye
 Dutluca, Yüreğir